Position in team sports is the joint arrangement of a team on its field of play during a game and to the standardized place of any individual player  in that arrangement. Much instruction, strategy, and reporting is organized by a set of individual player positions that is standard for the sport. 

For information about team or player positions in some particular sports, see:

Basketball
Basketball positions

Batting sports

Baseball fielding positions
Cricket fielding positions

Football
Association football positions
American football positions
Gaelic football positions
Rugby league positions
Rugby union positions

Hockey

Bandy positions are virtually the same as the association football positions
Field hockey positions
Ice hockey positions: 
Goaltender
Defenceman
Forward

"Service" sports
Lawn tennis players in doubles competition alternate between two positions. That is, the service side alternates as server and partner while the receiving side alternates as receiver and partner. There is no substitution of players and the two partners necessarily divide the two pairs of positions almost equally.
Volleyball players rotate through six positions, taken on the court at the serve. But the positions are not fixed during a volley, only moderately regulated. Volleyball player specialization is highly refined and strategy focuses on how to use specialized players in unequal ways.

See also
Gaelic football, hurling and camogie positions

 
Terminology used in multiple sports